KTMB may refer to:

 Keretapi Tanah Melayu Berhad, Malaysian railway
 KTMB (FM), a radio station licensed to Anchorage, Alaska, US
 KPDA (FM), formerly KTMB, a radio station licensed to Mountain Home, Idaho, US
 Miami Executive Airport, Florida, US (ICAO code)